The 1996 United States presidential election in Louisiana took place on November 5, 1996. Voters chose nine representatives, or electors to the Electoral College, who voted for president and vice president.

Louisiana was won by President Bill Clinton (D) by a margin of 12.07%, a major increase from the statewide results in 1992 when he carried the state by a margin of 4.61%. Clinton won most of the parishes and congressional districts, and dominated among the rural areas. 

Louisiana was in this era generally more competitive than the rest of the Deep South due to its large black population and a sizeable minority of white Blue Dog Democrats. It is also very racially divided, with whites voting Republican and blacks voting Democratic. Clinton was able to carry 33 percent of white voters, which threw the state toward his column. Despite such a sizeable margin, Louisiana was the only state that Clinton won by more than a 2.4 point margin which wasn't called by news networks for him as soon as the polls closed.

This election also marked the end of Louisiana as a competitive state in federal elections, as further years saw the state's political alignment more closely resemble those in other, nearby Deep South states like Mississippi and Alabama, as well as in tandem with Arkansas, Clinton's home state; rural, Democratic-voting cultural conservatives began siding with the Republican Party. Clinton's 927,837 votes is the most received by a Democratic presidential candidate in the state's history.

, this is the last time Louisiana supported a Democratic presidential candidate, as well as the last time a Democrat carried the following parishes: Acadia, Allen, Ascension, Avoyelles, Calcasieu, Caldwell, Cameron, Catahoula, Claiborne, Concordia, DeSoto, East Feliciana, Evangeline, Franklin, Iberia, Jackson, Jefferson Davis, Lafourche, Lincoln, Morehouse, Natchitoches, Plaquemines, Rapides, Red River, Richland, Sabine, Saint Bernard, Saint Charles, Saint Martin, Saint Mary, Tangipahoa, Terrebonne, Vermilion, Vernon, Washington, Webster, West Feliciana, and Winn.

Results

Results by parish

See also
 United States presidential elections in Louisiana
 Presidency of Bill Clinton

References

Louisiana
1996
1996 Louisiana elections